Poura  is a small department or commune of Balé Province in south-eastern Burkina Faso. Its capital lies at the town of Poura. According to the 1996 census, the department had a total population of 9,761.

Towns and villages
Largest towns and villages and populations in the department are as follows:

 Poura	(5 883 inhabitants) (capital)
 Basnéré	(386 inhabitants)
 Darsalam	(587 inhabitants)
 Kankélé	(591 inhabitants)
 Mouhoun III	(233 inhabitants)
 Poura-village	(1 069 inhabitants)
 Pig-poré	(637 inhabitants)
 Toécin	(375 inhabitants)

References

Departments of Burkina Faso
Balé Province